Tadazane may refer to:

Ōkubo Tadazane (1782–1837), the 7th daimyō of Odawara Domain in Sagami Province in mid-Edo period Japan
Fujiwara no Tadazane (1078–1162), Japanese noble and the grandson of Fujiwara no Morozane
Ogasawara Tadazane (1596–1667), Japanese daimyō of the early Edo Period, the son of Ogasawara Hidemasa

de:Tadazane
Japanese masculine given names